Kéllé Bryan (born 12 March 1975) is an English singer and actress, known as a member of girl group Eternal. In 2018, she began portraying the role of Martine Deveraux in the Channel 4 soap opera Hollyoaks, a role she played until 2022. She is also part of the Loose Women panel.

Early and personal life
Bryan was born on 12 March 1975 in Plaistow, Greater London. Aged 11, Bryan joined the Italia Conti Academy stage school, where she completed eight years of performing arts and qualified as a dance teacher. While at the school, she met Louise Nurding – the pair met record producer Denis Ingoldsby, who was forming a girl group.

Bryan was diagnosed with lupus in 1998 and is a patron of St Thomas' Lupus Trust. In 2010, she married Jay Gudgeon. The pair have two children together. In 2014, Bryan began to suffer heavy symptoms of her lupus. She lost a lot of hair, her sight, hearing and movement deteriorated, and she was unable to speak. She then had a seizure, and the doctors confirmed that her lupus was affecting her brain. After the seizure, Bryan had to relearn how to read and write, and continues to struggle with short-term memory loss.

Career
Bryan appeared in ITV's The Bill, and on 31 March 1992 she appeared as Debbie in BBC's EastEnders who was a college friend of Lloyd Tavernier (Garey Bridges). In 1993, Bryan and Nurding, together with sisters Easther and Vernie Bennett formed the 1990s British R&B girl group Eternal. Eternal sold millions of albums, including 16 consecutive top 15 UK chart singles such as "Stay", "Just a Step from Heaven", "Oh Baby I", "Power of a Woman", "I Am Blessed", "Someday", "Don't You Love Me", "I Wanna Be the Only One" and "Angel of Mine". Following her departure from Eternal, Bryan signed a record deal with Mercury Records and began work on her debut solo album, Breakfast in Bed, which was never released. In 2006, Bryan was a contestant on Love Island 2, finishing as the female runner-up.

In 2008, she contributed backing vocals to "I Found Love", the debut single by Lankai. Bryan also had starring roles in the musical comedy, The X-Tra Factor and a film called The Naked Poet, playing the part of Michelle. In 2012, she played the part of Fran in the BBC comedy Me and Mrs Jones. Bryan joined the cast of the Channel 4 soap opera Hollyoaks in September 2018, portraying the role of Martine Deveraux. From May 2019, she has been appearing regularly on ITV's show Loose Women. After four years of appearing on Hollyoaks, Bryan announced her exit from the show on 3 June 2022 with her final scenes airing that same day.

Discography

Studio albums

Singles

Filmography

Stage

Awards and nominations

References

External links
 
 

1975 births
21st-century Black British women singers
Actresses from Kent
Alumni of the Italia Conti Academy of Theatre Arts
Black British actresses
British contemporary R&B singers
English people of Sierra Leonean descent
English soap opera actresses
English television actresses
Eternal (band) members
Living people
Musicians from Kent
People from Lewisham
People with lupus